The Abilene Aviators were an American ice hockey team in Abilene, Texas. They played in the Western Professional Hockey League from 1998 to 2000.

Season-by-season record

Records
Games Terho Koskela 94
Goals Jean-Francois Gregoire 49
Assists Jean-Francois Gregoire 57
Points Jean-Francois Gregoire 106
PIM Eric Naud 270

Notable NHL players
Stephane Roy
Marty Dallman
Alan May

External links
 The Internet Hockey Database

Ice hockey teams in Texas
Defunct ice hockey teams in Texas
Sports teams in Abilene, Texas
Ice hockey clubs established in 1998
Sports clubs disestablished in 2000
1998 establishments in Texas
2000 disestablishments in Texas